Ellen Wiegers (born 1 May 1980) is a Dutch short track speed skater. She competed in three events at the 1998 Winter Olympics.

References

External links
 

1980 births
Living people
Dutch female short track speed skaters
Olympic short track speed skaters of the Netherlands
Short track speed skaters at the 1998 Winter Olympics
Sportspeople from Hengelo